Hothead Paisan: Homicidal Lesbian Terrorist is an alternative comic written and drawn by Diane DiMassa published 1991–1998. It features the title character generally wreaking violent vengeance on male oppressors. Recurring characters include Hothead's cat Chicken, her wise mystical friend Roz, a talking lamp, and her lover Daphne.

Publication
The series began in 1991, published under the imprint Giant Ass Publishing, run by DiMassa's partner. The series ran for 21 issues, ending in 1998, and were collected and published as two volumes: Hothead Paisan and The Revenge of Hothead Paisan. These volumes were later combined and republished with a 10-page introduction to the main character as a 428-page trade paperback The Complete Hothead Paisan.

Hothead
According to Gabrielle Dean, the character of Hothead represents a "phallicized dyke" who is "at the mercy of her own rage against society, which she expresses by castrating men who are exaggerated stand-ins for the patriarchal order".  Hothead has changed into a wolf and her hands have become chainsaws.  Kim Hall states that Hothead "is an image of feminist resistance that does not rest on purity."

In 2004, a version was staged as a musical, produced by Animal Prufrock at the Michigan Womyn's Music Festival. The cast included Ani DiFranco, Susan Powter, Ubaka Hill, Toshi Reagon, Julie Wolf, Kate Wolf, and Allyson Palmer of BETTY.

See also
 Dykes to Watch Out For
 Jane's World
 Wimmen's Comix

References

Further reading 
 
  
 Frueh, Joanna and Fierstein, Laurie. "Comments on the Comics", in 
 
 
 Queen, Robin M. "'I Don't Speak Spritch': Locating Lesbian Language", in 
 Scalettar, Liana. "Resistance, Representation and the Subject of Violence: Reading Hothead Paisan", in

External links
  (Archive)

1991 comics debuts
1990s LGBT literature
Comics characters introduced in 1991
American comics
Feminist comics
Fictional feminists and women's rights activists
Fictional lesbians
Humor comics
Lesbian-related comics
Satirical comics